Novoilikovo (Yañı İlek) is a rural locality (a village) in Ilikovsky Selsoviet, Blagoveshchensky District, Bashkortostan, Russia. The population was 16 as of 2010. There is 1 street.

Geography 
Novoilikovo is located 42 km north of Blagoveshchensk (the district's administrative centre) by road. Staroilikovo is the nearest rural locality.

References 

Rural localities in Blagoveshchensky District